Jonathon D. Hill (born February 11, 1985) is an American politician. He was a member of the South Carolina House of Representatives from the 8th District, serving from November 2014 to December 2022. He is a member of the Republican Party.

References

External links

Living people
1985 births
Republican Party members of the South Carolina House of Representatives
21st-century American politicians
People from Anderson, South Carolina